Vasil Kamburov (born 4 December 1975) is a retired Bulgarian footballer who last played for Rodopa Smolyan as a goalkeeper. He has also been employed as a goalkeeping coach at Loko Plovdiv. He was the 1st choice goalkeeper for Lokomotiv Plovdiv during their 1st and only season as champions of Bulgaria.

References

External links
 Profile at BulgarianPlayers.com
 2007-08 Statistics at PFL.bg

1975 births
Living people
Bulgarian footballers
PFC Lokomotiv Plovdiv players
PFC Belasitsa Petrich players
PFC Dobrudzha Dobrich players
First Professional Football League (Bulgaria) players
Association football goalkeepers
People from Veliko Tarnovo
Sportspeople from Veliko Tarnovo Province